Mickey's Merry Men (reissued as Mickey's Brigade) is a 1930 short film in Larry Darmour's Mickey McGuire series starring a young Mickey Rooney. Directed by Albert Herman, the two-reel short was released to theaters on July 20, 1930 by RKO.

Synopsis
Mickey and the Gang espire to be like Christopher Columbus and explore new worlds. Mickey competes against Stinkie Davis in order to borrow Mary Ann's father's boat for the exploring. When Mickey loses, he and the Gang use their own boat. Later, the kids travel to a 'new world' (actually a small area close to home) and find themselves up against Native Americans, skeletons, and a real-live bear.

Cast
Mickey Rooney - Mickey McGuire
Billy Barty - Billy McGuire
Jimmy Robinson - Hambone Johnson
Delia Bogard - Tomboy Taylor
Marvin Stephens - Katrink
Douglas Fox - Stinkie Davis

External links 
 

1930 films
1930 comedy films
American black-and-white films
Mickey McGuire short film series
1930 short films
American comedy short films
1930s English-language films
1930s American films